Xenosoma oratesina is a moth in the subfamily Arctiinae first described by Paul Dognin in 1916. It is found in Ecuador, Peru and Bolivia (Vincent & Laguerre, 2014).

References

Arctiinae